Meglin Kiddies was an American troupe of acting, music and dance performers, consisting of children up to the age of 16. It was also known as The Meglin Professional Children's School, The Meglin Dance Studio, Meglin's Dance School, and Meglin's Wondrous Hollywood Kiddies.

Background
The troupe was started by Ethel Meglin in 1928. Meglin was a Ziegfeld girl in feature films. Director/actor and Slapstick Keystone King Mack Sennett was supportive of the formation of the troupe's studio. Sennett donated a Meglin Kiddie studio building sign and assisted in securing an operations location on his lot. The Johnny Grant Building at 7018-7024 Hollywood Blvd once housed the Meglin Dance Studio on its second floor.

One of the most successful child stars of all time, Shirley Temple, was a Meglin Kiddie dancer when she was recruited for her first movie role: During a visit to the Meglin Kiddie studio, Charles Lamont, a director from Educational Pictures, chose Temple, hiding under the piano, for a part in a movie that he was about to direct."

Superstar Judy Garland was also a Meglin Kiddie. Garland's mother, Ethel Gumm, played the piano at the Meglin Kiddie studio to help pay for Garland's singing and dancing lessons there. The film debut of Judy Garland was in Meglin Kiddie short films. Garland also performed with the Meglin Kiddies over the radio, and live at theaters such as: Shrine Auditorium, Pantages Theatre (Hollywood), and Loew's State Theater in Los Angeles, California.

In the 1950s, the Meglin Kiddies had a television show.

Ethel Meglin retired in 1962, as did the studio and dance troupe.

Movies 
 The Big Revue (1929)--AKA "The Meglin Kiddie Revue" & AKA "The Starlet Revue"—with Judy Garland (Francis Gumm & Sisters)
 The Land of Oz (1932) --Production company and actors/dancers (Film adapted from the book, Land of Oz)
 Show Kids (1934)
 In Love with Life (1934) --Floor show performers at the Kiddie Kabaret
 Too Many Parents(uncredited) (1936) --Themselves
 Roarin’ Lead (1936) --Dancers
 Maytime (1937) --Children In Maypole Number
 The Wizard of Oz (1939) --Munchkin child actors and dancers
 Reg’lar Fellers (1941) --Billy Lee's Band --Associate Producer: Ethel Meglin

Notable Meglin Kids 
In alphabetical order:
 Scotty Beckett
 Jackie Cooper
 Roland Dupree
 Nola Fairbanks
 Judy Garland
 Farley Granger
 Virginia Grey
 Darryl Hickman
 Dwayne Hickman
 June Lang
 Billy Lee
 Cherylene Lee
   Virginia Lee
 Paul Marco
 Mary McCarty
 Ann Miller
 Sidney Miller
 June Preston
 Mickey Rooney
 Peggy Ryan
 Melody Thomas Scott
 Betta St. John
 Shirley Temple
 Jane Withers

References

External links

The Meglin Kiddies production of 

Dance companies in the United States
Performing groups established in 1928
Vaudeville performers